Hiroshi Nakamura (born 1974) is a Japanese architect, who designed the Kamikatsu Zero Waste Center, receiving the Dezeen, Architectural Institute of Japan and Japan Institute of Architects awards for it.

Biography 
Born in Tokyo. Spent his childhood in Kanazawa City, Ishikawa Prefecture and Kamakura City, Kanagawa Prefecture.

 1999 Completed the Master's degree in the Graduate School of Science and Engineering, Meiji University. Since his student days, he has received awards in the field of architectural design.
 1999-2002: Joined Kengo Kuma & Associates, Inc. Ltd. and served as the office's chief architect.
 2002 Established Hiroshi Nakamura & NAP.

Awards 

 2006 - JCD Award, Japan Commercial Environmental Design Association, Grand Prize (Lotus Beauty Salon)
 2008 - GOOD DESIGN AWARD, Gold Prize (Dancing trees, Singing birds)
 2008 - The Japan Institute of Architects Award (Dancing trees, Singing birds)
 2010 - 26th Shinkenchiku Award (now Yoshioka Award) (House C)
 2011 - 22nd JIA Newcomer Award (House C)
 2012 - AR + D Awards for Emerging Architecture, First Prize (UK) (Sayama Forest Chapel)
 2012 - JIA Environmental Architecture Award, First Prize (Roku museum)
 2013 - JCD Award, Japan Commercial Environment Designers Association, Grand Prize (TOKYU PLAZA OMOTESANDO HARAJUKU)
 2014 - JCD Award, Japan Commercial Environmental Design Association, Grand Prize (Ribbon Chapel)
 2014 - JIA Award for Excellence in Architecture (Sayama Forest Chapel)
 2015 - Architectural Institute of Japan, Recommendation (Roku museum)
 2015 - LEAF AWARDS, Overall Winner (Ribbon Chapel)
 2016 - WAN Sustainable Building Award, Winner (Kamikatz Public House)
 2016 - JCD Design Award, Gold Prize (Bella Vista SPA & MARINA ONOMICHI Erretegia)
 2016 - Japan Association of Architectural Firms, Awards for Architecture (Sayama Forest Chapel)
 2016 - 57th BCS Award (Ribbon Chapel)
 2016 - ARCASIA Awards for Architecture, Building of the Year (Sayama Forest Chapel)
 2016 - WAN Sustainable Buildings of the Year, Winner (Kamikatz Public House)
 2017 - Japan Association of Architectural Firms, Awards for Architecture (Erretegia)
 2017 - World Architecture Festival, House - Completed Buildings (Radiator House)
 2018 - Japan Association of Architectural Firms, Awards for Architecture (Kamikatz Public House)
 2018 - Record Houses (Lath House)
 2021 - Architectural Institute of Japan Award for Best Work (Kamikatsu Zero Waste Center)
 2021 - Japan Institute of Architects Environmental Architecture Award (Kamikatsu Zero Waste Center)
 2021 - Dezeen Awards, sustainable building of the year (Kamikatsu Zero Waste Center)
 2021 - DFA Design for Asia Awards, Grand Award, Gold Award, Environmental Design, Workspaces (ZOZO Head Office Building)
 2021 - JID AWARD, Grand Award (ZOZO Head Office Building)
 2021 - GOOD DESIGN AWARD (ZOZO Head Office Building)
 2021 - IIDA Global Excellence Awards, Corporate Space Large Category Winner (ZOZO Head Office Building)

Significant works 

 Lanvin Boutique Ginza- (Chuo-ku, Tokyo, February 2004)
 Lotus Beauty Salon- (Kuwana, Mie, January 2006)
 Gallery Sakuranoki - (Karuizawa, Kitasaku-gun, Nagano, April 2007)
 Dancing trees, Singing birds - (Meguro, Tokyo, August 2007)
 HOUSE C - (Chiba, October 2008)
 Roku museum  - (Tochigi, 2010)
 Tokyo International Airport Terminal 2 Extension - (Tokyo, October 2010)
 TOKYU PLAZA OMOTESANDO HARAJUKU - (Shibuya, Tokyo, 2012)
 Optical Glass House - (Hiroshima, 2012)
 GRAZ - (Tokyo, 2012)
 Sayama Lakeside Cemetery Community Hall - (Saitama, 2013)
 NasuTepee - (Tochigi, 2013)
 Ribbon Chapel - (Hiroshima, 2014)
 Sayama Forest Chapel - (Saitama, 2014)
 Sarugaku Cyclone - (Tokyo, 2014)
 Cockpit in wild plants - (Nagano, 2014)
 Kamikatz Public House - (Kamikatsu-cho, Tokushima, 2015)
 Bella Vista SPA & MARINA ONOMICHI Erretegia - (Hiroshima, 2015)
 Finding Rainbows - (Tokyo, 2016)
 Radiator House - (Chiba, 2016)
 House of Glittering Leaves - (Tokyo, 2016)
 Lath House - (Tokyo, 2017)
 Ohori Kindergarten & After School - (Fukuoka, 2017)
 GORA BREWERY & GRILL - (Kanagawa, 2017)
 Laboratory Under the Crop Field - (Hiroshima, Japan, 2018)
 Half Cave House - (Western Japan, 2018)
 Logs on the Dune - (Eastern Japan, 2019)
 Care house of the Wind Chimneys - (Okinawa, 2020)
 Kamikatsu Zero Waste Center - (Kamikatsu-cho, Tokushima, 2020)
 House of the Sacred Rock - (Kyoto, 2020)
 Kasuien - (Kyoto, 2020)
 My-riad of Optical Glass Bricks - (East Japan, 2020)
 ZOZO Head Office Building - (Chiba, 2020)
 Tree Hut on Volcano - (Kanagawa, 2020)
 Hoshino Resorts KAI Poroto - (Hokkaido, 2021)
 Ueno Toshogu Shrine Juyosho & Meditation Pavilion - (Taito-ku, Tokyo, 2022)

Others 

 He won the Nisshin Kogyo competition sponsored by Shinkenchiku for three consecutive years.
 During his graduate school days at Meiji University, he won second prize in the 24th Nisshin Kogyo Architectural Design Competition.
 He won the grand prize for 'Decorated House' at the Architecture Student Design Awards '97.

Books 

 Koisuru Kenchiku, Hiroshi Nakamura, December 3, 2007, ASCII, ISBN 4756150691
 Microscopic Designing Methodology, Hiroshi Nakamura, March 20, 2010, INAX Publishing
 Regional Social Sphere Model: Conceptualizing the space between the state and the individual, Riken Yamamoto + Hiroshi Nakamura + Ryuji Fujimura + Go Hasegawa + Koji Hara + Masaru Kaneko + Hiroki Azuma, March 30, 2010, INAX Publishing
 The Art of Architectural Reading, Akihisa Hirata + Sosuke Fujimoto + Hiroshi Nakamura + Yasutaka Yoshimura + Hideyuki Nakayama, October 25, 2010, TOTO Publishing
 Chronicle - JA114/Hiroshi Nakamura & NAP, Hiroshi Nakamura, June 10, 2019, Shinkenchiku-Sha

References

External links
 Hiroshi Nakamura & NAP

People from Tokyo Metropolis
Living people
1974 births
Meiji University alumni
21st-century Japanese architects

ja:中村拓志